L' Isola bianca (Italian: The white island) is a 1950 Italian short documentary film directed by Dino Risi.

External links
 

1950 films
1950s Italian-language films
Italian documentary films
1950 documentary films
Italian black-and-white films
1950s Italian films